The 1965 World Sportscar Championship season was the 13th season of FIA World Sportscar Championship racing. It featured the 1965 International Championship for GT Manufacturers and the 1965 International Trophy for GT Prototypes. The season ran from 28 February 1965 to 19 September 1965 and comprised 20 races.

The International Championship for GT Manufacturers was contested by Grand Touring Cars in three engine capacity divisions. The Over 2000cc division was won by Shelby ahead of Ferrari, while Porsche prevailed in the 2000cc division and Abarth-Simca took the 1300cc division. The International Trophy for GT Prototypes was won by Ferrari, ahead of Porsche and Ford.

Schedule

Although composed of 20 races, each class did not compete in all events.  Some events were for one class, while others were combined events.

Results

Race results

International Championship for GT Manufacturers

International Trophy for GT Prototypes

References

External links
 1965 World Sportscar Championship events
 1965 World Sportscar Championship tables
 Images from the 1965 International Championship for GT Manufacturers Retrieved from www.racingsportscars.com on 31 May 2009

 
World Sportscar Championship seasons
World Sportscar Championship season